Black Vibrations is an album by saxophonist Sonny Stitt recorded in 1971 and released on the Prestige label.

Reception
In his review for Allmusic, Scott Yanow stated: "once again it is the nonstop chugging of Sparks, Muhammad and either Leon Spencer or guest organist Don Patterson that fuels the fire".

Track listing 
All compositions by Leon Spencer except where noted
 "Goin' to D.C." – 7:26     
 "Aires" (Don Patterson, Sonny Stitt) – 5:34     
 "Black Vibrations" – 6:43     
 "Calling Card" (Stitt) – 6:27     
 "Where Is Love?" (Lionel Bart) – 2:23     
 "Them Funky Changes" – 7:55

Personnel 
Sonny Stitt – alto saxophone, tenor saxophone
Virgil Jones – trumpet
Leon Spencer Jr. (tracks 1, 3, 5 & 6), Don Patterson (tracks 2 & 4) – organ
Melvin Sparks – guitar 
Idris Muhammad – drums

References 

1971 albums
Prestige Records albums
Sonny Stitt albums
Albums recorded at Van Gelder Studio
Albums produced by Bob Porter (record producer)